McAtee is an Irish surname. The name is an Anglicisation of the Gaelic Mac an tSaoi, meaning "son of the scholar" or "son of the wise man".

Notable people with the name include: 
 Allison McAtee (born 1985), American actress and fashion model
 Andrew McAtee (1888–1956), Scottish footballer (Celtic, New Bedford and Scotland)
 Bub McAtee (1845–1876), American baseball player
 Charles D. McAtee (1928–2005), Marine Corps officer, FBI agent, attorney and director of Kansas penal institutions during the last executions held in the state
 David McAtee (1966/1967–2020), African American fatally shot by police in Louisville, Kentucky
 J. Linus McAtee (1897–1963), American jockey
 James McAtee (born 2002), English footballer
 John McAtee (born 1999), English footballer
 Jud McAtee (1920–2011), Canadian ice hockey player
 Norm McAtee (1921–2010), Canadian ice hockey player
 Rhodri McAtee (born 1984) Welsh rugby union player
 Waldo Lee McAtee (1883–1962), American ornithologist

See also
 Bill Macatee

References

Anglicised Irish-language surnames